Lesther David Jarquín (born 16 February 1992) is a Nicaraguan footballer who plays for Managua F.C.

References

1992 births
Living people
Nicaraguan men's footballers
Nicaragua international footballers
Managua F.C. players
Association football midfielders
Sportspeople from Managua